Furcatopanorpa is a genus of scorpionfly containing a single species, F. longihypovalva. It is endemic to China.

References 
 

Panorpidae
Monotypic insect genera
Arthropods of China